Lorenzo Live – Autobiografia di una festa is the first live album by the Italian singer-songwriter Jovanotti, released by Soleluna on 14 November 2000.

Track listing

Charts and certifications

Charts

References

2000 albums
Jovanotti albums
Italian-language albums